Rede is an archaic word meaning, among other things, "counsel" and "advice". It is cognate with  Dutch "raad", Luxembourgish "Rot", Common Scandinavian "råd", Icelandic "ráð" and German "Rat".

Rede may refer to:

People
 Edward Rede (by 1476-1544), English politician
 John Rede (disambiguation)
 Miroslav Rede (born 1938), Croatian sports journalist and former (soccer) football player
 Richard Rede (died after 1416), statesman and judge in Ireland
 Robert Rede (died 1519), English Chief Justice of the Common Pleas
 Robert William Rede (1815–1904), militiaman at the centre of Eureka Rebellion in Victoria, Australia
 Thomas Rede (c. 1390–c. 1455), English merchant, landholder, knight and public official
 William Rede (disambiguation)

Places
 Rede, Suffolk, England, a village
 River Rede, a river in Northumberland, England
 Réde, Hungary, a village

Other uses
 Rede S.A., a Brazilian multi-brand acquirer
 Wiccan Rede, also called the Rede, a statement that provides the key moral system in the neopagan religion of Wicca and related witchcraft-based faiths
 Rede, a term in Heideger's philosophy
 Sustainability Network, a Brazilian political party

See also
 
 
 Alexis von Rosenberg, Baron de Redé (1922–2004), French banker, aristocrat, aesthete, collector and socialite
 Richard the Redeless
 Reed (disambiguation)
 Read (disambiguation)
 Red (disambiguation)